The Tyson Invitational, is an annual indoor track and field meet which is held in early February at the Randal Tyson Track Center. It was first held in Track Capital of the South, in Fayetteville, Arkansas.

The competition is part of National Collegiate Athletic Association's Indoor and attracts high caliber athletes, including Olympic and World medalists.

World records
Over the course of its history, one world record has been set at the Tyson Invitational.

Meeting records

Men

Women

References

External links
2019 University of Arkansas Track and Field Home Meet Information
Meet Records 9 February 2018 updated

Annual indoor track and field meetings
Track and field competitions in the United States
Sports in Fayetteville, Arkansas
Annual sporting events in the United States
Track and field in Arkansas
February sporting events